Frederik Ryk Ludolf Eksteen (born ) is a South African rugby union player for the  in the Currie Cup and the  in the Rugby Challenge. His regular position is flanker.

References

South African rugby union players
Living people
1991 births
People from Mbombela
Rugby union flankers
Blue Bulls players
SWD Eagles players
Falcons (rugby union) players
Griquas (rugby union) players
Rugby union players from Mpumalanga